Feliks Khalibekov (born 3 February 1990) is a Russian male weightlifter, who competed in the 69 kg category and represented Russia at international competitions. He won the bronze medal in the snatch at the 2014 European Weightlifting Championships and the silver medal overall at the 2016 European Weightlifting Championships.

At the 2017 European Weightlifting Championships, Khalibekov won the bronze medal in men's 62 kg category.

Major results

References

External links
 
 

1990 births
Living people
Russian male weightlifters
Place of birth missing (living people)
20th-century Russian people
21st-century Russian people